John Saint may refer to:
 John Saint (cricketer)
 John Saint (agricultural chemist)

See also
 Saint John (disambiguation)